Qaleh-ye Hajji Galdi Khan (also Romanized as Qal‘eh-ye Ḩājjī Galdī Khān) is a village in Jafarbay-ye Sharqi Rural District, Gomishan District, Torkaman County, Golestan Province, Iran. At the 2006 census, its population was 411, in 86 families.

References 

Populated places in Torkaman County